Richard Benigno is a retired German-American soccer forward who played professionally in Europe and the United States.

Benigno attended Oklahoma City University (OCU) where he was the first player recruited when the school established a men's soccer team in 1986.  In 1989, his senior season, Benigno was a Third Team NAIA All American.  In 1990, OCU head coach Brian Harvey became the head coach of the Oklahoma City Spirit of the Lone Star Soccer Alliance.  Harvey brought several OCU players, including Benigno, into the team.  Benigno played two seasons with the Spirit.  The Spirit won the 1990 Lone Star Soccer Alliance title, defeating FC Dallas 3-0.  Benigno scored the second Spirit goal in that game.  Benigno spent the 1990-1991 indoor season with the Wichita Wings of the Major Indoor Soccer League.  He then moved to Europe where he played for several years.

External links
 footballdatabase: Richard Benigno
 MISL stats
 Former OCU all-American inspires Stars

References

Living people
1968 births
American soccer players
American expatriate soccer players in Germany
Karlsruher SC players
Lone Star Soccer Alliance players
Major Indoor Soccer League (1978–1992) players
Wichita Wings players
Association football forwards
Oklahoma City Stars men's soccer players
Soccer players from Dallas
American expatriate soccer players